Ivan Lendl was the defending champion, but Petr Korda defeated him 6–2, 6–2, in the final.

Seeds

  Stefan Edberg (semifinals)
  Michael Chang (semifinals)
  Ivan Lendl (final)
  Petr Korda (champion)
  Boris Becker (quarterfinals, withdrew)
  Sergi Bruguera (first round)
  Alexander Volkov (quarterfinals)
  Brad Gilbert (second round)

Draw

Finals

Top half

Bottom half

External links
Draw
Qualifying Draw

Singles